The Hong Kong Museum of Coastal Defence is a museum in Hong Kong, located in a former coastal defence fort overlooking the Lei Yue Mun channel, near Shau Kei Wan on Hong Kong Island. The fort was built by the British in 1887, intended to defend the eastern approaches to Victoria Harbour.

An exhibition entitled "600 years of Coastal Defence" is held permanently in the museum, which tells the story of the defence of the Hong Kong coastline from the time of the Ming Dynasty, through the First and Second Opium Wars and the Battle of Hong Kong, through to today.

History
On 8 December 1941, the Japanese launched their attacks on Hong Kong Island. After the fall of the New Territories and Kowloon, the British Forces immediately strengthened the defences at Lei Yue Mun to prevent the Japanese from crossing the Lei Yue Mun Channel from Devil's Peak. The defence forces managed to repulse several raids by the Japanese, but were eventually overwhelmed and the fort fell into enemy hands on 19 December. The fort no longer bore any defensive significance in the post-war period and became a training ground for the British Forces until 1987, when it was finally vacated.

In 1993, the Urban Council decided to convert the fort into a museum. It opened on 25 July 2000.

Displays
The museum consists of three main areas, namely the Reception area, the Redoubt, and the Historical Trail. It is converted from the hundred-year-old Lei Yue Mun Fort. Its historical structure has an extensive outdoor area with the unique architectural design, a strong tensile structure with other traditional building material, which provides a comfort and historical feeling for visitors.

The casemates inside the Redoubt were converted into exhibition galleries for permanent displays on the history of Hong Kong's Coastal Defence covering the Ming and Qing period, the British period, the Japanese invasion and the period after the transfer of sovereignty to China.

Historical military structures
Redoubt: It was built in 1887 and formerly the core military structure of the Lei Yue Mun Fort.
Central Battery: This battery was completed in March 1887. The gun barrel on the display is a 7-inch (17.8 cm) RML Mark 1 gun of 4.5 tons dating from the 1870s.
Western Battery: Two 9 inch (23 cm) muzzle loading guns mounted in this battery in March 1887. The barrel displayed here, which was found in the Admiralty Garden site in 1990, alone weighed 12 tons.
The torpedo station: The Brennan Torpedo station at Lei Yue Mun was built between 1892 and 1894. It was hewn out of the rock of the headland. It was the last to be constructed either in Britain or her overseas possessions.
Lei Yue Mun Pass Battery: This battery was built to defend the harbour from destroyers carrying small high-speed torpedoes; it was completed in March 1892.

Transportation
The museum is accessible within walking distance North East from Shau Kei Wan station of the MTR.

Status
The Hong Kong Museum of Coastal Defence is currently closed for renovation. It was to be re-opened in 2020. During the closure, the museum will organise an array of outreach programmes.

See also
 British Forces Overseas Hong Kong
 List of museums in Hong Kong
 Tensile structure

References

External links

 

History museums in Hong Kong
History of Hong Kong
Forts in Hong Kong
World War II sites in Hong Kong
Barracks in Hong Kong
Maritime museums in Hong Kong
Military and war museums in Hong Kong
Military of Hong Kong under British rule
A Kung Ngam